The Fellowship of Independent Methodist Churches (FIMC) is a Methodist denomination aligned with the conservative holiness movement that is based in the British Isles, with missions around the world. The history of the Fellowship of Independent Methodist Churches is a part of the larger history of Methodism in the British Isles, with the connexion forming as the result of a number of congregations departing both the Methodist Church in Ireland and the Free Methodist Church in 1973 due to what they perceived as the rise of Modernism in those denominations. The connexion is theologically conservative, aiming to uphold the original ethos of early Methodism. Though each congregation calls its own minister, a General Council of ministers and laypeople meets monthly to manage the work of the Fellowship of Independent Methodist Churches. Local congregations use the abbreviation "IMC" after their name, e.g. Omagh IMC, representing the full name Omagh Independent Methodist Church. The Fellowship of Independent Methodist Churches adheres to Wesleyan theology, teaching two dominical sacraments, Baptism and Holy Communion, in addition to observing the ordinance of headcovering. It promulgates the Methodist doctrines of the New Birth (first work of grace) and entire sanctification (second work of grace). A periodical called The Alert is regularly published by the Fellowship of Independent Methodist Churches.

References

External links 
Fellowship of Independent Methodist Churches
Statement of Faith - Fellowship of Independent Methodist Churches
Portadown Independent Methodist Church

Methodist denominations established in the 20th century
Holiness denominations
Holiness movement